The women's 60 metres at the 2012 IAAF World Indoor Championships will be held at the Ataköy Athletics Arena on 10 and 11 March.

Medalists

Records

Qualification standards

Schedule

Results

Heats

Qualification: first 2 of each heat (Q) plus the fastest 8 times (q) qualified.

Semifinals
Qualification: first 2 of each heat (Q) plus the fastest 2 times (q) qualified.

Final
The Final start in  17.06

References

60 metres
60 metres at the World Athletics Indoor Championships
2012 in women's athletics